The M198 is a medium-sized, towed 155 mm artillery piece, developed for service with the United States Army and Marine Corps. It was commissioned to be a replacement for the World War II-era M114 155 mm howitzer. It was designed and prototyped at the Rock Island Arsenal in 1969 with firing tests beginning in 1970 and went into full production there in 1978. It entered service in 1979 and since then 1,600 units have been produced.

The M198 was replaced in US and Australian service by the M777 howitzer.

Description

The M198 is towed by a 5 ton truck that is used to carry the 9 people crew with supplies and ammunitionthat, it is transported tail first. The gun tube can be rotated over the howitzer's trail legs to reduce its length, though this requires removal of the muzzle brake, or left in the firing position for faster deployment. When firing, the weapon is lowered onto its baseplate rather than being anchored to the ground, allowing for rapid emplacement. The breech is operated manually via a screw type mechanism that rests low in an ergonomic position.

The M198 fires separate-loading (non-fixed) ammunition and can be loaded with a variety of propellants and projectiles. The effective range is 18.1 kilometers when firing standard projectiles, which increases to 30 kilometers when firing rocket-assisted projectiles and guided ammunition. With the 52-caliber modification the range can surpass 40 kilometers. The weapon system requires a crew of 9 and is capable of firing at a maximum rate of four rounds per minute, two sustained.

The M198 was deployed in separate corps- and army-level field artillery units, as well as in artillery battalions of light and airborne divisions. It provided field artillery fire support for all Marine Air-Ground Task Force organizations until the adoption of the M777 howitzer.

Ammunition types

High explosive (HE)
(M-107 NC/DC): Explosive Composition B material packed into a thick, internally scored shell which causes a large blast and sends razor-sharp fragments at extreme velocities (5,000–6,000 meters per second). The kill zone has an approximate radius of 50 meters, and the casualty radius is 100 meters. The Marine Corps and US Army also uses the M795 High Explosive round.

Rocket-assisted projectile (RAP)
 A high-explosive rocket-assisted (HERA) M549 round with a greater range than the normal HE.

White phosphorus
 A base-ejecting projectile which can come in two versions: felt-wedge and standard. White phosphorus smoke is used to start fires, burn a target, or to create smoke which is useful in concealing the movements of friendly units.

Illumination
 Illumination projectiles are base-ejecting rounds which deploy a bright parachute flare ideally 600 meters above the ground and illuminate an area of approximately 1 grid square (1 square kilometer). Illumination rounds are often used in conjunction with HE rounds to illuminate the target area so that HE rounds can be fired more effectively. Illumination rounds can also be used during the daytime to mark targets for aircraft. The M485 illumination round burns for 120 seconds.

Dual-Purpose Improved Conventional Munition (DPICM)
 A base-ejecting projectile that drops 88 bomblets above a target. Each bomblet has a shaped-charge munition capable of penetrating two inches of solid steel as well as a fragmentation casing which is effective against infantry in the open. The DPICM round is effective against armored vehicles, even tanks (since the deck armor is usually the thinnest on the vehicle), and is also extremely useful against entrenched infantry in positions with overhead cover.

Area Denial Artillery Munition System (ADAMS)
 An artillery round that releases anti-personnel mines. These mines eject tripwires to act as booby traps, and when triggered are launched upward before exploding. They are designed to self-destruct after a pre-determined period.

Remote Anti Armor Mine System (RAAMS)
 An artillery round that releases anti-armor mines, usually used along with ADAMS rounds to prevent the antitank mines from being removed. Designed to self-destruct after a pre-determined period.

Copperhead
 An artillery launched guided high-explosive munition used for very precise targeting of high-value targets such as tanks and fortifications. No longer produced or used by the US military, it required the target to be designated with a laser designator system.

Sense and Destroy ARMor (SADARM)
 An experimental munition fired in the general direction of an enemy vehicle. The shell activates at a certain point in time ejecting a parachute and then guides itself to the nearest vehicle.

XM454 AFAP (artillery fired atomic projectile) (W48)
 The XM454 AFAP (W48) nuclear artillery shell had a 155mm caliber and an explosive yield of only . All units were retired from service in 1992.

Replacement
It was introduced in 2005.

Operators

Current operators
 : 18 in service with the Royal Bahraini Army
 : Brazilian Army 120 units.
 : 12 
 : 12
 : 120 howitzers supplied by the United States.
 : Total is 219 pieces. 36 howitzers operated by the LAF since the 1980s, 41 howitzers received in 2008, followed by 30 M-198 Howitzers in January 2010, 72 pieces delivered on February 8, 2015, and a batch of 40 pieces on September 8, 2016.
 : 35 units.
 : 184 in service with the Pakistan Army.
 : 42
 : 18 in service
 : 57–60 units in service.
 : 116 units in service with Royal Thai Army

Former operators
 : 36
 : 52 captured. Some were taken back while other were destroyed by air strikes.
 : 358

See also
 List of artillery
 List of crew served weapons of the US Armed Forces
 2A36 Giatsint-B
 FH-70
 M795
 M864

References

External links

 Weapon Profile as part of The Whirlwind War The United States Army in Operations DESERT SHIELD and DESERT STORM a publication of the United States Army Center of Military History
 www.fas.org – M198 Towed Howitzer
 www.globalsecurity.org – M198 Towed Howitzer
 www.military.com – M198 155 mm Towed Howitzer
 Development prototype XM198 (U.S. Army photo)

155 mm artillery
Cold War artillery of the United States
Field artillery
Artillery of the United States
United States Marine Corps equipment
Howitzers
Military equipment introduced in the 1970s